Lake of the Woods 37B is a First Nations reserve in Kenora District, Ontario. It consists of an island near the Canada–United States border in Lake of the Woods. It is one of the reserves of the Animakee Wa Zhing 37 First Nation.

References

External links
 Canada Lands Survey System

Anishinaabe reserves in Ontario
Communities in Kenora District